Reed mat is lathing supplied in a roll. It is made from natural reeds laid parallel, and bound using zinc-plated narrow gauge wire to form a long sheet.

Reed mat is suitable for internal use as a base for plastering on walls and ceilings. It can be used against a solid background or over studs or joists as a practical alternative lining material to gypsum plasterboard, clay panel or lath and plaster. Reed mats are particularly suited to using with lime, clay or gypsum plasters in building restoration and new-build.

External links
 Reed mat usage

Building materials